Yaşar Ören (born 1942) is a Turkish cross-country skier. He competed in the men's 15 kilometre event at the 1968 Winter Olympics.

References

1942 births
Living people
Turkish male cross-country skiers
Olympic cross-country skiers of Turkey
Cross-country skiers at the 1968 Winter Olympics
Sportspeople from Ağrı
20th-century Turkish people